The Curse of Davros is a Big Finish Productions audio drama based on the long-running British science fiction television series Doctor Who. It was broadcast on BBC Radio 4 Extra from 25 June to 2 July 2016.

Plot
Davros has developed mind swapping technology. He instructs his Daleks to implement it in the year 1815, at the Battle of Waterloo.

Cast
The Doctor – Colin Baker
Flip Jackson – Lisa Greenwood
Davros – Terry Molloy
Jared – Ashley Kumar
Napoleon – Jonathan Owen
Captain Pascal – Rhys Jennings
The Duke of Wellington – Granville Saxton
Marshal Ney – Robert Portal
Captain Dickson – Christian Patterson
The Daleks – Nicholas Briggs

Continuity
The Second Doctor also participates in the Battle of Waterloo in the novel World Game, when he has to prevent his enemies, the time-travelling Players, from altering the outcome of the battle.

References

External links
The Curse of Davros

2012 audio plays
Sixth Doctor audio plays
Davros audio plays
Dalek audio plays
Napoleonic Wars in fiction
Cultural depictions of Arthur Wellesley, 1st Duke of Wellington
Cultural depictions of Napoleon
Works about the Battle of Waterloo
Fiction set in 1815
Fiction set in 2012